The term Hakhel (Hebrew: הקהל haqhēl) refers to a biblical commandment of assembling all Israelite men, women and children, as well as converts to assemble and hear the reading of the Torah by the king of Israel once every seven years.

Originally this ceremony took place at the site of the Temple in Jerusalem during Sukkot in the year following a Seventh Year. According to the Mishna, the "commandment to assemble" (Hebrew: מצות הקהל mitzvat hakhel) was performed throughout the years of the Second Temple era and, by inference, during the First Temple era as well. The biblical mitzvah of Hakhel is only in effect when all the Jewish people reside in Israel. However, more recently attempts have been made to revive a symbolic form of hakhel.

In the Bible
The Hebrew Hiphil verb haqhêl (Hebrew: הַקְהֵ֣ל, "assemble"), from which comes the term mitzvat hakhel, is used in :
"9 Moses wrote down this Teaching and gave it to the priests, sons of Levi, who carried the Ark of Yhwh’s Covenant, and to all the elders of Israel. 10 And Moses instructed them as follows: Every seventh year, the year set for remission, at the Feast of Booths, 11 when all Israel comes to appear before Yhwh your God in the place that He will choose, you shall read this Teaching aloud in the presence of all Israel.12 Gather the people—men, women, children, and the strangers in your communities—that they may hear and so learn to revere Yhwh your God and to observe faithfully every word of this Teaching. 13 Their children, too, who have not had the experience, shall hear and learn to revere Yhwh your God as long as they live in the land that you are about to cross the Jordan to possess (NJPS with modifications)."

In the Mishnah
According to the Mishnah, the ceremony was conducted on the first day of Chol HaMoed Sukkot, the day after the inaugural festival day, on behalf of all the Jews who participated in the pilgrimage to Jerusalem. Trumpets would sound throughout Jerusalem (Tosefta) and a large wooden platform would be erected in the Temple in the court of the women (Hebrew: ezrat hanashim עזרת הנשים). The king would sit on this platform and all in attendance would gather around him. The hazzan haknesset (החזן הכנסת, "servant of the synagogue")  would hand the Book of the Law to the rosh haknesset (ראש הכנסת, "archisynagogue"), who would hand it to the deputy kohen gadol, who would hand it to the High Priest, who would present it to the king. According to the Sefer Hachinuch, the king would accept the sefer Torah while standing, but could sit while he read it aloud. The rest of Israel were required to stand, which led to Jeroboam's revolt.

The king began the reading with the same blessings over the Torah that are recited before every Aliyah La-Torah in synagogues today. Seven additional blessings were recited at the conclusion of the reading.

The reading consisted of the following sections from the Book of Deuteronomy:
 From the beginning of the book through Shema Yisrael (6:4);
 The second paragraph of the Shema (11:13-21);
 "You shall surely tithe" (14:22-27);
 "When you have finish tithing" (26:12-15);
 The section about appointing a king (17:14-20);
 The blessings and curses (28:1-69).

Why children?
Many commentators ask why young children were also required to be present at this assembly. Rabbi Eleazar ben Azariah said: “Men would come to learn and women, to listen.  Why would children come?  To provide a reward for those who brought them” (Chagigah 3a).

Twentieth-century revival
The idea of reviving the mitzvat hakhel in modern times was first proposed by Rabbi Eliyahu David Rabinowitz-Teomim (the "Aderes"), who published two pamphlets on the issue, Zecher leMikdash and Dvar Be'ito.

Chief Rabbi Shmuel Salant of Jerusalem would gather all the Talmud Torah students in front of the Western Wall on the first day of Chol HaMoed Sukkot and read to them the same passages that the king would read at Hakhel.

The first official Israeli ceremony of Hakhel was held during Sukkot of 1945, the year following the sabbatical year. A special service was held in the Yeshurun Synagogue, after which a mass procession moved on to the Western Wall where the Torah portions were read. Similar ceremonies presided over by Israel government officials have been held every seven years since. The Hakhel ceremony conducted in 1994 was attended by the Chief Rabbis of Israel, the President of Israel and other dignitaries. The ceremony performed at the Western Wall in 2001 was led by the President of Israel, Moshe Katzav.

Rabbi Menachem Mendel Schneerson, the Lubavitcher Rebbe, urged Jews everywhere to conduct large and small Hakhel gatherings throughout the Hakhel year in synagogues and private homes to foster greater unity and increase Torah learning, mitzvah observance, and the giving of charity.

References

Further reading

External links
Time Magazine report on the commemoration of Hakhel in Israel in October 1952
Hakhel Guide on chabad.org

Hebrew words and phrases in the Hebrew Bible
Tishrei observances
Positive Mitzvoth
Talmud concepts and terminology